Rain Eensaar (born 24 November 1974 in Lemmatsi, Kambja Parish, Tartu County) is an Estonian orienteer, rogainer and adventure racer. At the 10th World Rogaining Championships in Přebuz, Czech Republic in 2012 he won a gold medal and the title of the World Rogaining Champion in team with his brother Silver Eensaar in Men's teams category. At 11th World Rogaining Championships in Alol, Pskov oblast Russia in 2013 they successfully defended the title of the World Rogaining Champion. At 12th World Rogaining Championships in Black Hills, South Dakota in 2014 they won the third consecutive title of World Rogaining Champions.

In 2011, he and his brother Silver won a gold medal and the title of the European Rogaining Champion in Rauna, Latvia.

At the European Adventure Race Championships, he won a bronze medal in 2013 in Poland and a silver medal in 2014 in Turkey.

He has won four gold medals at Estonian orienteering championships.

References

External links
 
 Rain Eensaar at World of O Runners

1974 births
Living people
People from Kambja Parish
Estonian orienteers
Male orienteers
Adventure racing